Rabanera del Pinar is a municipality located in the province of Burgos, Castile and León, Spain. According to the 2004 census (INE), the municipality has a population of 141 inhabitants.

Rabanera del Pinar is a place with a paleobotanical interest, and is home to a large pine forest of Pinus sylvestris (Scots pine).

References

External links
Rabanera del Pinar 

Municipalities in the Province of Burgos